Debromomarinone is a chemical compound isolated from marine actinomycetes.

References

Benzochromenes
Resorcinols
3-Hydroxypropenals within hydroxyquinones
Oxygen heterocycles
Heterocyclic compounds with 4 rings
Tetracyclic compounds